Deadline is an American drama television series created by Dick Wolf, that aired on NBC from October 2, 2000, to October 30, 2000. It stars Oliver Platt as Wallace Benton, star columnist for the fictional New York Ledger, a daily tabloid newspaper seen in many episodes of Law & Order and modeled after the real-life New York Post.

Cast and characters
Oliver Platt as Wallace Benton
Bebe Neuwirth as Nikki Masucci
Tom Conti as Si Beekman
Lili Taylor as Hildy Baker
Hope Davis as Brooke Benton
Damon Gupton as Charles Foster
Christina Chang as Beth Khambu

Production
Series creator Dick Wolf hired Robert Palm as head writer and executive producer. Palm had worked for years as a newspaper reporter on the Hartford Times and the Los Angeles Herald Examiner before moving into screenwriting with jobs on Miami Vice. He and Wolf had worked together previously on the tenth season of Law & Order. They didn't want to do another "cop show" and agreed on one with journalism as its focus. In 1999, Wolf pitched the show to NBC with Oliver Platt as its star and sold it without producing a pilot, as is the norm, but instead with a three-minute trailer. Wolf and Palm worked with NBC Entertainment President Garth Ancier on developing the show with Platt in mind. Plots for the show were based on true stories from newspaper articles that Palm and Wolf found. John L. Roman produced the show, having worked with Wolf on Exiled and DC. They later went on to do Law & Order: Criminal Intent and Chicago Fire together. Richard Esposito, a New York newspaper veteran of 20 years, was hired as a consultant on the show. He worked with the actors and writers on outlines of stories and on "everything that helps them get a feel for the tone and pace of a newspaper." He also introduced Platt and other cast members to journalists around the city. Wolf invited director Michael Ritchie to direct episodes of Deadline but he had to drop out for personal reasons.

Platt had been approached numerous times to do a television show but it was Wolf's reputation and the chance to do it in his hometown so that he could be close to his family that persuaded him. Wallace Benton was modeled on veteran New York journalist Jimmy Breslin, Mike McAlary and other New York tabloid columnists. To research for the role, Platt spent time with crime reporters Phil Messing of the New York Post, Lenny Levitt of Newsday, and Juan Gonzalez and Jim Dwyer of the New York Daily News. The actor went out on stories with them, watched them interview and listened to them work the phones. During lunches, he remembers that he "got them to tell me their trade secrets."

The New York Ledger'''s offices were constructed at the old New York Post building on South Street in New York City. The show based the look of their offices on old black and white photographs of the newspaper. The Post allowed the show to shoot the pilot episode in its old offices and then agreed to a short-term lease through November 2000. Shooting started in mid-July 2000 and the first episode debuted on October 2, 2000. Deadline was scheduled to run Mondays at 9 pm opposite ABC's Monday Night Football and Fox's Ally McBeal.

Episodes

ReceptionVariety magazine praised Platt's work on the show in their review: "Platt, best-known for his work on the big screen, is a colorful choice for Benton, and, judging from the first episode, he can carry the bulk of the action." USA Today criticized the show's authenticity in their review: "The only thing accurate about Deadline is the sense of urgency implied by the title. Someone had better fix this show fast, before it becomes yesterday's news." The Boston Globe found fault with some of the characters on the show: "Benton's merry band of journalism students are silly, and the show should replace them with an expanded cast of Ledger'' co-workers."

The Pilot episode was seen by 14.3 million viewers but its rating declined steadily afterwards with 6.8 million viewers watching the last episode. NBC cancelled the show after five episodes. NBC showed the remaining episodes during the spring of 2001, in at least one part of the United States; they followed the network's broadcasts of Saturday night XFL football games in the western time zones.

References

External links
  on Wolf Entertainment
 
 
 Dick Wolf and Oliver Platt talk about Deadline at the New York Press Club

NBC original programming
Television series by Universal Television
Law & Order (franchise)
2000 American television series debuts
2000 American television series endings
2000s American drama television series
Television shows set in New York City
Television series about journalism
Television series by Wolf Films
Television series created by Dick Wolf